Joana Bárcia (born 29 March 1972) is a Portuguese actress and director.  Her film credits include Cinzento e Negro, River of Gold, A Filha and A Raiz do Coração.  Her television credits include the co-starring role of Hermínia in mini-series O Dia do Regicídio.  

Bárcia has been a director with the television series Belmonte and Mulheres.

External links

1972 births
Living people
Portuguese film actresses
Portuguese television actresses
Place of birth missing (living people)